Komehr Rural District is a rural district (dehestan) in the Central District of Sepidan County, Fars Province, Iran. At the 2006 census, its population was 3,812, in 853 families.  The rural district has 11 villages.

References 

Rural Districts of Fars Province
Sepidan County